The 14th Toronto International Film Festival (TIFF) took place in Toronto, Ontario, Canada between September 7 and September 16, 1989. In Country by Norman Jewison was selected as the opening film.

Awards

Programme

Gala Presentation
In Country by Norman Jewison
Drugstore Cowboy by Gus Van Sant
Life and Nothing But by Bertrand Tavernier
Mystery Train by Jim Jarmusch
The Killer by John Woo
The Seventh Continent by Michael Haneke
My Left Foot by Jim Sheridan
Cinema Paradiso by Giuseppe Tornatore
The Cook, the Thief, His Wife & Her Lover by Peter Greenaway
Sweetie by Jane Campion
Apartment Zero by Martin Donovan
Under the Glacier by Guðný Halldórsdóttir
Monsieur Hire by Patrice Leconte
Aviya's Summer by Eli Cohen 
A Dry White Season by Euzhan Palcy
Needle by Rashid Nugmanov
Chattahoochee by Mick Jackson

Canadian Perspectives
American Boyfriends by Sandy Wilson
Black Mother, Black Daughter by Sylvia Hamilton and Claire Prieto
Brown Bread Sandwiches by Carlo Liconti
Bye Bye Blues by Anne Wheeler
Cold Comfort by Vic Sarin
Foreign Nights by Izidore K. Musallam
In the Belly of the Dragon (Dans le ventre du dragon) by Yves Simoneau
Jesus of Montreal (Jésus de Montréal) by Denys Arcand
Justice Denied by Paul Cowan
Lessons on Life (Trois pommes à côté du sommeil) by Jacques Leduc
Roadkill by Bruce McDonald
Sous les draps, les étoiles by Jean-Pierre Gariépy
Speaking Parts by Atom Egoyan
Stealing Images by Alan Zweig
Strand: Under the Dark Cloth by John Walker
Tending Towards the Horizontal by Barbara Sternberg
Termini Station by Allan King
The Top of His Head by Peter Mettler
The Traveller by Bruno Lazaro
Unfaithful Mornings (Les matins infidèles) by François Bouvier and Jean Beaudry
The Vacant Lot by William D. MacGillivray
Welcome to Canada by John N. Smith
Where the Spirit Lives by Bruce Pittman

Midnight Madness
Dr. Caligari by Stephen Sayadian
Lenny Live and Unleashed by Andy Harries
Opera by Dario Argento
Carnival of Souls by Herk Harvey
Alien Space Avenger by Richard W. Haines
Funny by Bran Ferren
Over Easy by Ignacio Valero
Shimmelsteen by Michael Wolfe
No Such Thing As Gravity by Alyce Wittenstein
Whoregasm by Nick Zedd
Urotsukidoji: Legend of the Over-Fiend by Hideki Takayama
Heavy Petting by Obie Benz

Documentaries
The Big Bang by James Toback
Eat the Kimono by Kim Longinotto & Jano Williams
Roger & Me by Michael Moore
White Lake by Colin Browne

References

External links
 Official site
 TIFF: A Reel History: 1976 - 2012
1989 Toronto International Film Festival at IMDb

1989
1989 film festivals
1989 in Toronto
1989 in Canadian cinema